Helena Sverrisdóttir (born 11 March 1988) is an Icelandic professional basketball player for Haukar of the Icelandic Úrvalsdeild kvenna. Helena has been named the Icelandic Women's Basketball Player of the Year 12 times. She has won the Icelandic championship five times and the Slovak championship two times.

Early life
Helena grew up in Hafnarfjörður and played basketball and football in her youth.

Club career
Helena first played for Haukar's senior team in 2000, at the age of 12. After winning Division I in 2002 with Haukar, Helena took the Úrvalsdeild by storm in 2002-2003, averaging 17.1 points, 9.5 rebounds and 4.3 assists. She was named the Úrvalsdeild Young Player of the Year and was widely regarded as the top prospect in the country. Despite her performance, Haukar finished last in the league and were relegated back to Division I.

In 2003-2004, at the age of 16, Helena averaged a quadruple-double in the Icelandic Division I with 37.6 points, 13.3 rebounds, 11.6 assists and 10.2 steals.  Out of the 16 games she played, she posted a quadruple-double in six of them. Her best scoring output came against Ármann/Þróttur where she scored 86 points.

She played college basketball for TCU from 2007 to 2011.

Helena returned to Haukar in 2016 after 9 seasons away and helped the club achieve the best regular season record in the Úrvalsdeild kvenna. For the season she averaged 24.4 points, 13.3 rebounds and 6.8 assists, and was named the Úrvalsdeild Domestic Player of the Year. Helena missed most of the 2016-2017 season due to being pregnant of her first child. She returned to the floor on March 19 in a loss against Stjarnan, five weeks after the birth of her daughter.

On December 20, 2017, Haukar loaned Helena to Good Angels Kosice until the end of January 2018. On January 21, Helena helped the Good Angels win the Slovak Basketball Cup.

On April 30, 2018, she helped Haukar to win the national championship, their fourth championship and first one in nine years. 
Helena was named the Úrvalsdeild Playoffs MVP after averaging 20.2 points, 12.2 rebounds and 10.8 assists in the finals series. On May 4, Helena was named the Úrvalsdeild Domestic Player of the Year and to the Úrvalsdeild Domestic All-First Team.

On 16 May 2018, Helena signed with Ceglédi EKK of the Hungarian Nemzeti Bajnokság I/A. In November she left the club after a contract dispute.

On 15 November 2018, Helena signed with Úrvalsdeild kvenna club Valur. On 16 February 2019, she won the Icelandic Cup after Valur defeated Stjarnan in the Cup finals, 74-90. In the game, Helena had 31 points, 13 rebounds and 6 assists. On 27 April 2019, she helped Valur win its first ever national championship after beating Keflavík in the Úrvalsdeild finals 3-0. After the season she was named the Úrvalsdeild Domestic Player of the Year for the second straight year and to the Úrvalsdeild Domestic All-First Team.

Valur opened the 2019–20 season by defeating Keflavík, 105-81, in the annual Icelandic Super Cup where Helena posted 14 points, 13 rebounds and 7 assists. It was Valur's first Super Cup win and the victory made them the holders of all four major national crowns, the others being the national championship, the national cup and the league championship which is awarded for the best regular season record in the Úrvalsdeild.

In December 2019, she was named the Icelandic Women's Basketball Player of the Year for the 12th time in her career.

On 29 May 2020, Helena announced that she was pregnant with her second child.

On 2 June 2021, she won the national championship after Valur beat Haukar 3–0 in the Úrvalsdeild finals and was named the Playoffs MVP. After the season, she was named to the Úrvalsdeild Domestic All-First Team.

On 19 June 2021, Helena signed back with her hometown team of Haukar. On 18 September 2021, she led Haukar to victory in the Icelandic Cup and was named the Cup Finals MVP after turning in 26 points, 9 rebounds and 9 assists in the 94–89 win against Fjölnir in the Cup finals. On 30 September, she scored 32 points in the second leg of the 2021–22 EuroCup Women Qualifiers matches against Clube União Sportiva, leading Haukar to an aggregate win of 160-157 and a seat in the EuroCup regular season. On 19 March 2022, she won the Icelandic Cup again after Haukar defeated Breiðablik in the 2022 Cup Finals.

TCU statistics

Source

Icelandic national team
Since 2002 Helena has played 66 games for the Icelandic national basketball team.

Personal life
Helena's sister, Guðbjörg Sverrisdóttir, plays for Valur in Úrvalsdeild kvenna and was named to the 2016 Úrvalsdeild Domestic All-First Team. She has also played for the Icelandic national team since 2014. Her brother, Kristján Leifur Sverrisson, played for Haukar in Úrvalsdeild karla.

Helena is married to former Icelandic national team player Finnur Atli Magnússon with whom she has one daughter.

Awards, titles and accomplishments

Individual awards
Icelandic Women's Basketball Player of the Year (12): 2005–2015, 2019
Úrvalsdeild Domestic Player of the Year (6): 2005, 2006, 2007, 2016, 2018, 2019
Úrvalsdeild Domestic All-First Team (7): 2005–2007, 2016, 2018, 2019, 2021
Úrvalsdeild Playoffs MVP (4): 2007, 2018, 2019, 2021
Úrvalsdeild Young Player of the Year : 2003
Icelandic Cup Finals MVP (3): 2019, 2021, 2022
Mountain West Conference Player of the Year: 2010
Mountain West Conference All-Tournament Team (3): 2009, 2010, 2011
Mountain West Conference Freshman of the Year: 2008

Titles

Iceland
Icelandic champion (5): 2006, 2007, 2018, 2019, 2021
Icelandic Basketball Cup (5): 2005, 2007, 2019, 2021, 2022, 2023
Icelandic Super Cup (3): 2006, 2019, 2021
Icelandic Company Cup (3): 2005, 2006, 2015
Icelandic Division I (2): 2002, 2004

Slovenia
Slovak champion (2): 2012, 2013
Slovak Basketball Cup (3): 2012, 2013, 2018

Accomplishments
Úrvalsdeild scoring champion: 2005
Úrvalsdeild assist leader (4): 2005, 2006, 2007, 2016

References

External links
TCU Bio

1988 births
Living people
Helena Sverrisdottir
Helena Sverrisdottir
Helena Sverrisdottir
Helena Sverrisdottir
Helena Sverrisdottir
Helena Sverrisdottir
TCU Horned Frogs women's basketball players
Helena Sverrisdottir
Helena Sverrisdottir
Helena Sverrisdottir
Forwards (basketball)